Cryoburn is a science fiction novel by American writer Lois McMaster Bujold, first published in October 2010. Part of the Vorkosigan Saga, it was nominated for the Hugo Award for Best Novel in 2011, as Bujold's ninth Best Novel nomination. Also in 2011, it was one of the top five finishers in the poll for the Locus Award for Best Science Fiction Novel.

Plot summary 

Cryoburn takes place six or seven years after Diplomatic Immunity.  Miles Vorkosigan, the main character in the series, is 39 years old. He is sent by Emperor Gregor to the planet Kibou-daini ("New Hope") to investigate White Chrysanthemum Cryonics Corporation. WhiteChrys, a major "cryocorp", to which sick or dying people go to be frozen in hopes of one day being revived and cured, is opening a subsidiary on Komarr, arousing suspicions. The narrative follows three points of view: those of Miles, his Armsman Roic, and Jin Sato, a local Kibou-daini boy.

At a conference, an attempt is made to kidnap Miles and the other attendees. Miles avoids capture because an allergic reaction to the drug used on him makes him extremely hyperactive, and escapes into the below-ground Cryocombs, where the frozen are stored. Roic is caught along with Raven, a cryo-revival specialist from the Durona Group who assisted in reviving Miles after his death on Jackson's Whole (detailed in Mirror Dance).

When Miles finds his way back to the surface, he encounters Jin, an eleven-year-old boy living with his chickens and other pets in a disused building. Jin introduces him to a society of outcasts living in abandoned facilities. This helps Miles piece together what is really going on.

Publication history 

Lois Bujold announced the name of the book on her blog: "My editor, playing the part of the Supreme Court, has kindly cast the deciding vote in this close election: the new Miles book shall henceforth be known as CryoBurn."  The other two choices under consideration were Cold Breath and Cryopolis.

Bujold read the first two chapters at Denvention 3 in August 2008. The full-length electronic Advance Reader Copy was made available through Webscriptions on August 3, 2010. The hardcover version of Cryoburn also comes with a CD-ROM containing E-Book versions of the omnibus editions of the Vorkosigan Saga.

References 

2010 American novels
2010 science fiction novels
American science fiction novels
Novels by Lois McMaster Bujold
Vorkosigan Saga
Cryonics in fiction
Baen Books books